Akana is a rural locality (a selo), the administrative centre of and one of two settlements, in addition to Chkalov, in Akaninsky Rural Okrug of Nyurbinsky District in the Sakha Republic, Russia. Its population as of the 2010 Census was 461; down from 495 recorded during the 2002 Census.

References

Notes

Sources
Official website of the Sakha Republic. Registry of the Administrative-Territorial Divisions of the Sakha Republic. Nyurbinsky District. 

Rural localities in Nyurbinsky District